Chesapeake is an unincorporated community and census-designated place in Lawrence County, Missouri, United States.  It is located on Route 174, approximately five miles east of Mount Vernon.

Chesapeake currently houses a fish hatchery, operated by the Missouri Department of Conservation.

A post office called Chesapeake was established in 1850, and remained in operation until 1914. The community's name commemorates the Capture of USS Chesapeake.

Demographics

References

Unincorporated communities in Lawrence County, Missouri
Unincorporated communities in Missouri